Telakapalli Ravi (born 1956) is an Indian Telugu journalist, political analyst and writer. He is the author of many works in Telugu. He is president of Sahiti Sravanti, an organisation of Telugu literature. He is also host for the talk show Straight Talk with Telakapalli.

Career 
Ravi is also a noted political analyst on Telugu television and media. He is also a communist party supporter

References

External links
 Telakapalli Ravi's Official Website

Telugu writers
Living people
1956 births
Journalists from Andhra Pradesh